Ohio's 52nd House of Representatives district is currently represented by Jennifer Gross. The district is a part of Butler County and includes West Chester Township, Liberty Township, Fairfield Township, and southeast Sharonville. As of the 2010 census, a total of 99,936 civilians reside within Ohio's fifty-second state house district.

Representatives

Election results

2020

2018

References

Populated places in Butler County, Ohio
Ohio House of Representatives districts